Tina Mihelić (born 30 December 1988 in Rijeka) is a Croatian sports sailor. At the 2012 Summer Olympics, she competed in the Women's Laser Radial class, finishing in 17th place.  In the same event at the 2016 Olympics, she finished in 13th place.

She was the 2013 World Champion in the same event.  She also won the European title in 2010.

References

External links
 
 
 

1988 births
Living people
Croatian female sailors (sport)
Olympic sailors of Croatia
Sailors at the 2012 Summer Olympics – Laser Radial
Sailors at the 2016 Summer Olympics – Laser Radial
Mediterranean Games gold medalists for Croatia
Mediterranean Games silver medalists for Croatia
Mediterranean Games medalists in sailing
Competitors at the 2009 Mediterranean Games
Competitors at the 2013 Mediterranean Games
Sportspeople from Rijeka